Kep Football Club (Khmer: កែប), is a football club based in Kep Province, Cambodia. The club competes in the Hun Sen Cup, the major national cup competition of Cambodian football. The team represents the Province and competes annually in the Provincial Stage of the competition.

References
https://cncc-football.com/hun-sen-cup.html
http://kep.gov.kh

External links 
Hun Sen Cup
Football clubs in Cambodia